A Tootsie Pop (known as Tutsi Chupa Pop in Latin America) is a hard candy lollipop filled with the chocolate-flavored chewy Tootsie Roll candy. They were invented in 1931 by an employee of The Sweets Company of America. Tootsie Rolls had themselves been invented in 1896 by Leo Hirschfield. The company changed its name to Tootsie Roll Industries in 1969.

The candy made its debut in 1931 and since then various flavors have been introduced. The idea came to be when a man who worked at The Sweets Company of America licked his daughter's lollipop at the same time she was chewing his Tootsie Roll. He loved the idea and pitched it to everyone at the next snack ideas meeting.

In 2002, 60 million Tootsie Rolls and 20 million Tootsie Pops were produced every day.

Commercials

Tootsie Pops are known for the catch phrase "How many licks does it take to get to the Tootsie Roll center of a Tootsie Pop?". The phrase was first introduced in an animated commercial which debuted on US television in 1970. In the original television ad, a questioning boy (voiced by Buddy Foster) proposes the question to a cow (voiced by Frank Nelson), a fox (voiced by Paul Frees), a turtle (voiced by Ralph James) and an owl (voiced by Paul Winchell). Each one of the first three animals tells the kid to ask someone else, explaining that they would bite a Tootsie Pop every time they lick one. Eventually, he asks the owl, appearing wise, who offers to investigate. He starts licking the orange Tootsie Pop, but bites into it after only three licks. The child walks away, saying to himself, "If there's anything I can't stand, it's a smart owl." The commercial ends the same way, with various flavored Tootsie Pops unwrapped and being "licked away" until being crunched in the center with Herschel Bernardi asking, "How many licks does it take to get to the Tootsie Roll center of a Tootsie pop? The world may never know."

While the original commercial is 60 seconds long, an edited 30-second version and 15-second version of this commercial are the ones that have aired innumerable times over the years.

In the shorter 30-second ad, Mr. Owl returns the spent candy stick, and the boy's final line is replaced with him frowning at the empty stick.

The 15-second commercial (which is still broadcast today as of November 2022) only shows the boy with Mr. Owl, and a different narrator (Frank Leslie) speaks the same concluding line (this time without mentioning "Tootsie Roll" in the sentence), but without the scene showing the Tootsie Roll pops slowly disappearing with an APM Music track "Crepe Suzette" (composed by Cyril Watters) playing in the background. The question still stands unanswered.

In the 1990s, a new commercial was made featuring a boy asking a robot and a dragon how many licks it takes to get to the center, with the Tootsie Pops known for the catch phrase "How many licks to the center of a Tootsie Pop?", rather than "How many licks does it take to get to the Tootsie Roll center of a Tootsie Pop?".

Rumors and set attempts

Redeemable wrappers
At some point, a rumor began that the lollipop wrappers which bore three unbroken circles were redeemable for free candy or even free items like shirts and other items. The rumor was untrue, but some shops have honored the wrapper offer over the years, allowing people to "win" a free pop.

Some stores redeemed lollipop wrappers with the "shooting star" (bearing an image of a child dressed as a Native American aiming a bow and arrow at a star) for a free sucker. This was clearly up to the store owner and not driven by the lollipop manufacturer. One convenience store in Iowa City, Iowa, for example, gave candy away when the children asked.  Also, in Cedar Rapids, Iowa, Osco Drug used to give children free suckers for star wrappers. In 1994, the owner of Dan's Shortstop told a reporter that when he first opened children came by often, but after a while, he said he had to stop giving things away. Giveaways also occurred in Chico, California, where a 7-Eleven store manager in the Pleasant Valley area, said she had to stop because it had become too expensive. Since 1982, Tootsie Roll Industries has been distributing a "consolation prize", the short story, The Legend of the Indian Wrapper, to children who mail in their Indian star wrappers.

Lick tests
A student study by Purdue University concluded that it took an average of 364 licks to get to the center of a Tootsie Pop using a "licking machine", while it took an average of 252 licks when tried by 20 students. Yet another study by the University of Michigan concluded that it takes 411 licks to get to the center of a Tootsie Pop. A 1996 study by undergraduate students at Swarthmore College concluded that it takes a median of 144 licks (range 70–222) to get to the center of a Tootsie Pop.

In 2014, the Tribology Laboratory at the University of Florida published a study examining the coupled effects of biology, corrosion, and mechanical agitation on the wear of Tootsie Roll Pops. Self-reported wear data from 58 participants was used in conjunction with statistical analysis of actual lollipop cross-sectional information in a numerical simulation to compute the average number of licks required to reach the Tootsie Roll center of a Tootsie Roll Pop. The number of licks required to reach the center, based on equatorial cross-section data, was found to be nearly independent of the licking style with the one-sided approach requiring 195±18 licks and the full-surface approach requiring 184±33. Detailed examination of the lollipops indicates that the minimum candy shell thickness is rarely (if ever) located along the equator. Using the global minimum distance resulted in a calculated 130±29 licks to reach the center, independent of licking style.

Flavors

Original assortment
 Chocolate 
 Raspberry
 Cherry  
 Orange 
 Grape
 Banana

Lemon was an early flavor, as well; it disappeared in the mid-1980s, and returned to the assortment after 2016.
All assortment flavors can also be purchased in single-flavor bulk.
In 2004, and again in 2011 with different flavors, Tootsie Pops would have a random, rotating sixth flavor.

Tropical Stormz
 Strawberry/Banana
 Citrus Punch
 Berry Berry Punch
 Lemon/Lime
 Orange/Pineapple

"Wild Berry" assortment
 Wild Apple Berry
 Wild Blueberry
 Wild Black Cherry
 Wild Cherry Berry
 Wild Mango Berry

Non-standard
 Pomegranate (rotated as a "sixth flavor" in 2012)
 Blueberry (rotated as a "sixth flavor" in 2011)
 Lemon-Lime (rotated as a "sixth flavor" in 2004)
 Blue Raspberry (rotated as a "sixth Flavor" in 2004)
 Watermelon (rotated as a "sixth flavor" in 2004)
 Strawberry (rotated as a "sixth flavor" in 2004)
 Strawberry-Watermelon (rotated as a "sixth flavor" in 2015)
 Pineapple
 Tangerine
 Fruit Punch
Non-standard flavors can be now purchased in single-flavor bulk.

Additional flavors: Strawberry-Vanilla, Cherry (Valentine's Day), Tangerine, Pineapple, Tropical Punch, Wild Blackberry and Strawberry Watermelon.

Seasonal
 Candy Cane (Christmas seasonal flavor, also available as Pop Drops)
 Caramel (Halloween seasonal flavor, but seems to be sold all year)
 Slurp Juice (Fortnite crossover)

"Sweet & Sour Bunch" pops 
The "Sweet & Sour Bunch" flavors came in a package of eight Assortment pops, at .50 oz. / 14.8 grams each.
 Sour Apple
 Sour Blackberry
 Sour Blue Raspberry
 Sour Lemon
 Sweet Cherry
 Sweet Grape
 Sweet Orange
 Sweet Raspberry

Tootsie Fruit Chews Pops 
Hard candy matched with a complementary Tootsie Fruit Chew flavor core.
 Orange Pop/Lime Center
 Strawberry Pop/Lemon Center
 Lemon Lime Pop/Orange Center
 Blue Raspberry Pop/Cherry Center

Sister products
 Tootsie Rolls - the original Tootsie candy on which Tootsie Pops were based
 Tootsie Pop Drops - Smaller Tootsie Pops without the stick, made to be portable and often sold in a pocket package.
 Pop Drops Assortment: Blue Raspberry, Cherry, Chocolate, Orange, and Grape
 Candy Cane Pop Drops (seasonal)
 Caramel Apple Pops - flat lollipop of apple-flavored hard candy, coated with a chewy caramel layer
 Caramel Apple Pops (original flavor: Green Apple a.k.a. Granny Smith)
 Caramel Apple Orchard Pops (three flavors: Red Macintosh, Green Apple, Golden Delicious)
 Charms Blow Pops - Tootsie Pops with bubble gum in the center, instead of a Tootsie Roll
 Charms Blow Pops Assortment: Cherry, Sour Apple, Grape, Watermelon, Strawberry, Blue Raspberry
 Super Blow Pops
 Blow Pops Minis
 Way-2-Sour Blow Pops

See also
 List of confectionery brands

References

External links
 Official page on Tootsie Pops from the manufacturer
 Scientific study about the number of licks to get to the center of a Tootsie Pop

Brand name confectionery
Tootsie Roll Industries brands
Products introduced in 1931
Candy
Lollipops